Feng Tao (born 17 February 1983) is a Chinese footballer.

Career statistics

Club

Notes

References

1985 births
Living people
Chinese footballers
Chinese expatriate footballers
Association football midfielders
Hong Kong Premier League players
Qingdao Hainiu F.C. (1990) players
Tuen Mun SA players
Chinese expatriate sportspeople in Hong Kong
Expatriate footballers in Hong Kong